Oana Elena Golimbioschi (born 21 May 1980) is a former professional tennis player from Romania.

A right-handed player based in Italy, Golimbioschi began competing on the professional tour in 1996. She won her two ITF singles titles in 1997, then the following year reached her best ranking of 266 in the world. 

In doubles, she has a career-high ranking of 290 and won six ITF titles. She featured in three Fed Cup ties for Romania as a doubles player in 1998, with her only win coming in a rubber against Latvian pairing Agnese Gustmane and Līga Dekmeijere (partnering Raluca Sandu).

ITF finals

Singles (2–9)

Doubles (6–12)

References

External links
 
 
 

1980 births
Living people
Romanian female tennis players
Italian people of Romanian descent